Whitney is an American band from Chicago, which formed in 2015 and is signed to Secretly Canadian. The band was formed shortly after the breakup of members Max Kakacek and Julien Ehrlich's band Smith Westerns in late 2014. They released their debut album, Light Upon the Lake, in June 2016 and have toured internationally.

Career 
After the breakup of Smith Westerns in 2014, guitarist Max Kakacek joined with drummer Julien Ehrlich, who also played drums for Unknown Mortal Orchestra, to form Whitney. As roommates, the duo shared songwriting duties while Ehrlich became the main vocalist. Initially the band also featured members of the Touching Voids, Ehrlich's previous band. In June 2015, the band made the song "No Matter Where We Go" available digitally through the Lead Riders label. It included former Smith Westerns member Ziyad Asrar on rhythm guitar, Malcolm Brown on keyboards, bassist Josiah Marshall and brass player Will Miller.

In 2015, the band played around thirty shows, mostly in support of other artists. This included Tobias Jesso Jr., who got the band in contact with Jonathan Rado, who would produce their debut studio album. In September of that year, they joined Rado at his Los Angeles home studio to record. In January 2016, the band released the single "No Woman" supported by a video and toured Europe in anticipation of their new album. They also performed at the 2016 SXSW festival.

On June 3, 2016, the album Light Upon the Lake was released, and shortly afterwards they embarked on their first headlining European tour.

In 2017, the band announced a new demos album with a previously unreleased song, "You and Me". In March 2017, Whitney released two new songs, "You've Got a Woman" and "Gonna Hurry (As Slow as I Can)". Both are covers. Light Upon the Lake: Demo Recordings was released on November 10, 2017.

In an interview published in April 2019, the band mentioned their second official album, due in 2019, would deal with "fear, confusion, and substance abuse". They shared a song titled "FTA" from the album in June 2019, and released the lead single “Giving Up” on June 6.

The album Forever Turned Around was released on August 30, 2019. It was partially recorded at a winery in Cotati, California. To celebrate the release, Chicago mayor Lori Lightfoot announced August 30 as Whitney Day.

In May 2020, Whitney and Waxahatchee released covers of both "Take Me Home, Country Roads" and "Rain". Both tracks appeared on Whitney's album of covers titled Candid, which was released on August 14, 2020, and also included covers of "Strange Overtones" (originally by David Byrne and Brian Eno) and "Hammond Song" (originally by The Roches).

On June 16, 2022, Whitney released their single "Real Love" and announced that their next album Spark would be released on September 16, 2022 on Secretly Canadian. The album features production by John Congleton and Brad Cook. On December 9, 2022, Whitney released the EP Live at Electric Lady, which includes a cover of Beach House's "Other People".

Style 
Ehrlich outlined the approach to songwriting as "when we were writing for Whitney, we were doing what we wanted to do, the music was really freeing". Paul Lester in the Guardian described the band as "think Bon Iver, with elements of folk and country, only given a Chicago soul makeover". They cite Levon Helm and Allen Toussaint as inspiration.

Discography

Albums 
Studio albums
 Light Upon the Lake (2016)
 Forever Turned Around (2019)
 Candid (2020)
 Spark (2022)

EPs
 Live at Electric Lady (2022)

Demo albums
 Light Upon the Lake: Demo Recordings (2017)

Singles 
 "No Matter Where We Go" (June 2015)
 "No Woman" (January 2016)
 "You've Got a Woman / Gonna Hurry (As Slow as I Can)" (March 2017)
 "You and Me" (Demo) (September 2017)
 "Giving Up" (June 2019)
 "FTA" (November 2019)
 "Far, Far Away" (November 2019)
 "Rain" (May 2020)
 "Take Me Home, Country Roads" (May 2020)
 "Hammond Song" (July 2020)
 "Strange Overtones" (August 2020)
 "Real Love" (June 2022)
 "Blue / Twirl" (July 2022)
 "Memory / County Lines" (August 2022)
 "For A While" (January 2023)

References

External links

 

Indie rock musical groups from Illinois
Musical groups from Chicago
Secretly Canadian artists